Andréas Hountondji (born 11 January 2002) is a French professional footballer who plays as a forward for  club Orléans, on loan from Caen.

Professional career
On 27 June 2019, Hountondji signed his first professional contract with Caen. He made his professional debut with Caen in a 1–1 Ligue 2 tie with Pau FC on 3 April 2021.

On 27 June 2022, Hountondji moved to Quevilly-Rouen on a season-long loan. On 12 January 2023, he went on a new loan to Orléans.

Personal life
Born in France, Hountondji is of Beninese descent.

References

External links
 

2002 births
French sportspeople of Beninese descent
Black French sportspeople
Living people
French footballers
Association football forwards
Stade Malherbe Caen players
US Quevilly-Rouen Métropole players
US Orléans players
Ligue 2 players
Championnat National players
Championnat National 2 players
Championnat National 3 players